Rex Barnes (born June 4, 1959) is a Canadian politician.

Born in Grand Falls-Windsor, Newfoundland and Labrador, Barnes was a member of the Progressive Conservative caucus in the House of Commons of Canada, representing the riding of Gander—Grand Falls.  Elected in a by-election in 2002, he lost his seat in the 2004 election to Liberal candidate Scott Simms, running as the member for Bonavista—Exploits.

Barnes has been a paramedic, and a volunteer worker. Barnes was the Progressive Conservative critic for Public Works and Government Services, and Transport. He served as a city councillor in Grand Falls-Windsor for 9 years.

Barnes served as mayor of Grand Falls-Windsor from September 2005 to September 2009.

In February 2011, he announced plans to challenge incumbent MHA Ray Hunter for the Progressive Conservative party nomination in Grand Falls-Windsor-Green Bay South for the 2011 provincial election. Barnes lost the nomination receiving 327 votes to Hunter's 533.

Barnes ran as an independent candidate in Grand Falls-Windsor-Buchans in the 2015 provincial election. He finished in third place with 19.6% of the vote.

References

External links 

1959 births
Living people
Members of the House of Commons of Canada from Newfoundland and Labrador
Progressive Conservative Party of Canada MPs
Mayors of places in Newfoundland and Labrador
People from Grand Falls-Windsor
Candidates in Newfoundland and Labrador provincial elections
21st-century Canadian politicians